Jonas Svensson (born 6 March 1993) is a Norwegian professional footballer who plays for Turkish Süper Lig club Adana Demirspor and the Norway national team. Originally a midfielder, Svensson was converted to right-back in 2014.

Club career
As a 15- and 16-year-old, Svensson played several games in the 2. divisjon for Levanger FK. In August 2009, Svensson moved to Rosenborg. His debut came on 10 March 2011 in Rosenborg's 4–4 draw against Lillestrøm. He then made his first league start against Haugesund, replacing the injured Michael Jamtfall. He signed a professional contract with Rosenborg in June 2011 until the end of the 2013 season.

In Rosenborg's 4–0 win over Sarpsborg 08 on 3 June 2011, Svensson scored two goals. On 13 July 2011, he made his European debut against Icelandic side Breiðablik in the Champions League Second qualifying round.

During the 2014 season, with Cristian Gamboa struggling with injury and later attending the World Cup, Svensson stepped in as a right-back for Rosenborg, and he did so with success. After Gamboa's move to West Bromwich Albion after an impressive world cup with Costa Rica, he continued to play right-back throughout the rest of the season. After the season, he made the decision to switch from midfield to right-back permanently.

On 20 April 2016, Svensson reached 200 games for Rosenborg at the age of 23 years and 45 days, making him the youngest player for the club to do so and beating Per Ciljan Skjelbred's record by 14 days.

On 30 January 2017, Svensson signed for AZ.

On 10 July 2021, Svensson signed a three-year deal with the newly promoted Süper Lig side Adana Demirspor.

International career
Svensson made his senior team debut for Norway, after a few matches as non-playing sub, on 1 June 2016, in a 3–2 win over Iceland.

Career statistics

Club

International

Scores and results list Norway's goal tally first, score column indicates score after each Svensson goal.

Honours
Rosenborg
Norwegian top division: 2015, 2016
Norwegian Cup: 2015, 2016

Individual
Eliteserien Defender of the Year: 2015, 2016
Eredivisie Player of the Month: January 2018

References

External links
 
 Profile at Voetbal International
 

1993 births
Living people
People from Verdal
Association football midfielders
Norwegian footballers
Rosenborg BK players
AZ Alkmaar players
Adana Demirspor footballers
Eliteserien players
Norwegian Second Division players
Eredivisie players
Süper Lig players
Norway international footballers
Norway youth international footballers
Norway under-21 international footballers
Norwegian expatriate footballers
Norwegian expatriate sportspeople in the Netherlands
Norwegian expatriate sportspeople in Turkey
Expatriate footballers in the Netherlands
Expatriate footballers in Turkey
Norwegian people of Swedish descent
Sportspeople from Trøndelag